The Ministry of Defense is a ministry of the Government of Haiti. This ministry is responsible for military and defense of the country, along with playing an integral role in the Prime Minister's Cabinet.

List of ministers
 2 September 1804 - 17 October 1806: Etienne Gérin
 post suspended
 14 March 1843 - 4 April 1843: André Laudun
 4 April 1843 - 7 January 1844: Philippe Guerrier
 7 January 1844 - 3 May 1844: Hérard Dumesle
 3 May 1844 - 1 March 1846: Jacques Sylvain Hyppolite
 1 March 1846 - 16 November 1846: Tape-à-l'Oeil Lazarre
 16 November 1846 - 3 April 1847: Alexis Dupuy
 3 April 1847 - 9 April 1848: Jean M. Paul
 9 April 1848 - 15 January 1859: Louis Dufrene (duc de Tiburon)
 17 January 1859 - 10 August 1861: Thimoléon Déjoie
 10 August 1861 - 31 January 1863: Laguerre Obas
 31 January 1863 - 13 August 1866: Théodate Philippeaux
 13 August 1866 - 7 March 1867: Jean-Pierre Hector
 7 March 1867 - 13 March 1867: J.J. Saint-Victor
 
 8 May 1867 - 18 February 1869: Ménélas Clément
 18 February 1869 - 6 September 1869: Casseus Daniel
 6 September 1869 - 6 November 1869: Victorin Chevalier
 8 November 1869 - 29 December 1869: Innocent Michel Pierre
 29 December 1869 - 23 March 1870: Montmorency Benjamin
 23 March 1870 - 27 April 1871: Pierre Monplaisir Pierre
 27 April 1871 – 15 July 1871: Jean-François Cauvin
 15 July 1871 - 15 May 1874: Saul Liautaud
 15 May 1874 - 24 April 1876: Prosper Faure
 24 April 1876 – 20 July 1876: Morin Montasse
 20 July 1876 – 24 November 1876: Casseus Daniel (2nd time)
 24 November 1876 - 17 July 1878: Auguste Montas
 17 July 1878 - 14 November 1878: Turenne Carrié
 14 November 1878 – 30 June 1879: Jean-Chrisostome François
 30 June 1879 - 17 August 1879 : Armand Thoby (a.i)
 1 September 1879 - 3 October 1879: Hériston Hérissé
 3 October 1879 - 3 November 1879: Séïde Thélémaque
 3 November 1879 - 31 December 1881: Henri Piquant
 31 December 1881 - 14 March 1884: Innocent Michel Pierre (2nd time)
 14 March 1884 - 15 May 1887: A. Roul Brenor Prophète
 15 May 1887 - 10 August 1888: Tirésias Simon Sam
 September 1888 - 28 September 1888: Séïde Thélémaque
 1 October 1888 - 15 October 1888: Pierre Théoma Boisrond-Canal
 19 November 1888 - 27 April 1889: Anselme Prophète
 27 April 1889 - 31 May 1889: Joseph Cadet Jérémie (a.i.)
 31 May 1889 - 29 October 1889: Sénèque M. Pierre
 29 October 1889 - 12 August 1890: Borno Monpoint
 12 August 1890 - 19 August 1891: Jean-Baptiste Béliard
 19 August 1891 - 11 August 1892: Morin Montasse
 11 August 1892 - 5 October 1893: Turenne Jean-Gilles
 5 October 1893 - 24 October 1893: Fabius Ducasse (a.i.)
 24 October 1893 - 27 December 1893: Adelson Verne
 27 December 1893 - 31 March 1896: Tirésias Simon Sam (2nd time)
 6 April 1896 - 17 December 1896: Borno Monpoint (2nd time)
 17 December 1896 - 13 December 1897: Septimus Marius
 13 December 1897 - 12 May 1902: Vilbrun Guillaume Sam
 20 May 1902 - 21 December 1902: Pierre Nord Alexis
 22 December 1902 - 6 December 1908: Cyriaque Célestin
 8 December 1908 - 19 December 1908: Charles Roland
 19 December 1908 - 19 July 1911: Septimus Marius (2nd time)
 20 July 1911 - 4 August 1911: Horelle Monplaisir
 4 August 1911 - 16 August 1911: Oreste Zamor
 16 August 1911 - 16 September 1912: Horacius Limage Philippe
 16 September 1912 - 17 May 1913: François Beaufossé Laroche
 17 May 1913 – February 1914: Philippe Argant
 8 February 1914 – 11 November 1914: Félesmin Etienne
 11 November 1914 – 27 February 1915: Charles Salnave
 9 March 1915 – 30 April 1915: Mizaël Codio
 30 April 1915 – 27 July 1915: Jean-François Milfort
 14 August 1915 - 3 October 1915: Charles Leconte
 3 October 1915 - 18 December 1915: Joseph Dessources
 18 December 1915 - 9 May 1916: Annulysse André
 Post abolished
1942–1946: Vély Thébaud
1946: Paul Magloire
1947–1948: Georges Honorat
1948–1950: Louis Raymond
1950: Castel Démesmin
1950: Paul Magloire
1950: Luc Fouché
1950–1952: Arsène Magloire
1952–1953: Paracelse Pélissier
1953–1954: Ducasse Jumelle
1954–1955: Luc Prophète
1955–1956: Adelphin Telson
1956: Alphonse Racine
1956–1957: Rodolphe Barau
1957: Thézalus Pierre-Etienne
1957: Léonce Bernard
1957: Seymour Lamothe
1957: Gaston Georges
1957–1959: Frédéric Duvigneau
1959: Jean A. Magloire
1959–1961: Aurèle Joseph
1961–1962: Boileau Méhu
1962–1964: Luc D. François
1964–1967: Jean M. Julmé
1967: Morille Figaro
1967–1971: Aurèle Joseph
1971–1972: Luckner Cambronne
1972–1973: Roger Lafontant
1973–1974: Breton Nazaire
1974–1976: Paul Blanchet
1976–1977: Pierre Biamby
1977–1978: Aurélien Jeanty
1978–1979: Achille Salvant
1979: Bertholand Edouard
1979–1980: Claude Raymond
1980–1981: Frantz Médard
1981–1982: Edouard Berrouet
1982: Joseph Alexis Guerrier
1982–1985: Roger Lafontant
1985: François Guillaume
1985: Jean-Marie Chanoine
1985–1986: Pierre Merceron
1986–1988: Williams Régala
1988–1989: Carl Dorsainville
1989: Acédius Saint-Louis
1989–1990: Fritz Romulus
1990–1991: Jean Thomas
1991: René Préval
1991–1992: Gracia Jean
1992: Serge M. Charles
1992–1993: Carl-Michel Nicholas
1993–1994: Jean Béliotte
1994: Willio Noailles
1994: Carl-Michel Nicholas
1994–1996: Wilthan Lhérisson
1996–2011: Post abolished
2011–2012: Thierry Mayard-Paul
2012–2014: Jean Rodolphe Joazile
2014–2016: Lener Renaud
2016-2017:Enex Jean-Charles
2017-2019:Hervé Denis
2020 - present  Jean W. Dorneval

See also
Haiti
List of heads of state of Haiti
Prime Minister of Haiti
List of colonial governors of Saint-Domingue

Defense
Government ministries of Haiti